Dasypeltis medici, known commonly as the East African egg-eater and the eastern forest egg-eater, is a species of nonvenomous snake in the family Colubridae. The species is endemic to Africa.

Etymology
The specific name, medici, is in honor of Italian physiologist Michele Medici.

Geographic range
D. medici is found in Kenya, Malawi, Mozambique, Somalia, South Africa, Eswatini, Tanzania, Zambia, and Zimbabwe.

Habitat
The preferred habitat of D. medici is lowland evergreen forest.

Description

Diet
D. medici, like all species in the genus Dasypeltis, feeds exclusively on birds' eggs. It can swallow an egg three times the size of its head.  The egg is slit open by vertebral hypapophyses which extend into the esophagus. The collapsed empty shell is regurgitated.

Reproduction
D. medici is oviparous.

References

Further reading
Bianconi, "J. Jos." (1859). Specimina Zoologica Mosambicana, Fasciculus XII. pp. 497–506 + Plates 25–27. (Dipsas medici, new species, pp. 501–502 + Plate 26). (in Latin).

Reptiles described in 1859
Reptiles of Africa
Colubrids